Joseph Harold "Joey" Erskine (October 17, 1930 – January 16, 2009) was an American athlete who was active as a welterweight boxer in 1953 and 1954, and as a long distance runner from 1975 to 1980.

Professional boxing record

|-
|align="center" colspan=8|4 Wins (0 knockouts, 4 decisions), 6 Losses (1 knockout, 5 decisions), 1 Draw 
|-
| align="center" style="border-style: none none solid solid; background: #e3e3e3"|Result
| align="center" style="border-style: none none solid solid; background: #e3e3e3"|Record
| align="center" style="border-style: none none solid solid; background: #e3e3e3"|Opponent
| align="center" style="border-style: none none solid solid; background: #e3e3e3"|Type
| align="center" style="border-style: none none solid solid; background: #e3e3e3"|Round
| align="center" style="border-style: none none solid solid; background: #e3e3e3"|Date
| align="center" style="border-style: none none solid solid; background: #e3e3e3"|Location
| align="center" style="border-style: none none solid solid; background: #e3e3e3"|Notes
|-
|Loss
|
|align=left| Joe Lissy
|KO
|5
|9 Sep 1954
|align=left| Eintracht Oval, Astoria, New York
|align=left|
|-
|Loss
|
|align=left| O'Dell Hayes
|PTS
|4
|3 Sep 1954
|align=left| Madison Square Garden, New York, New York
|align=left|
|-
|Win
|
|align=left| Willie Sydnor
|PTS
|6
|12 Aug 1954
|align=left| Fort Hamilton Arena, Brooklyn, New York
|align=left|
|-
|Win
|
|align=left| O'Dell Hayes
|PTS
|4
|14 Jul 1954
|align=left| Madison Square Garden, New York, New York
|align=left|
|-
|Loss
|
|align=left| Joe Lissy
|PTS
|4
|17 May 1954
|align=left| St. Nicholas Arena, New York, New York
|align=left|
|-
|Win
|
|align=left| Paul Kostopoulos
|PTS
|6
|30 Apr 1954
|align=left| St. Nicholas Arena, New York, New York
|align=left|
|-
|Loss
|
|align=left| Joe Lissy
|PTS
|4
|19 Apr 1954
|align=left| Eastern Parkway Arena, Brooklyn, New York
|align=left|
|-
|Loss
|
|align=left| Joe Lissy
|PTS
|4
|29 Mar 1954
|align=left| Eastern Parkway Arena, Brooklyn, New York
|align=left|
|-
|Loss
|
|align=left| Artie Thelemaque
|PTS
|4
|12 Mar 1954
|align=left| Madison Square Garden, New York, New York
|align=left|
|-
|Win
|
|align=left| Paddy Flood
|PTS
|4
|1 Dec 1953
|align=left| Westchester County Center, White Plains, New York
|align=left|
|-
|-align=center
|Draw
|align=left|
|align=left| Roger Dennis
|align=left|PTS
|align=left|6
|28 Nov 1953
|align=left| Community Building, Waterville, Maine
|align=left|
|}

Long Distance Running Career
In the mid-1970s while in his mid-forties, Erskine, as a member of the Millrose Athletic Association, became a champion ultramarathoner participating in such races as the Boston and New York Marathons, the New York Road Runner Club's Metropolitan 50 Miler, as well as the London to Brighton Ultramarathon.

References

External links
 
"Joey Erskine Gets One Writer's Nod as Colorful Boxer" by Oscar Fraley. A UP article which appeared on page 2 of The Milwaukee Journal on July 19, 1954.
Metropolitan 50 Miler Top Performances by Category 1971-2007 (Joe Erskine finished 6th overall in 1976, 7th overall in 1977, and 3rd overall in 1979)

1930 births
2009 deaths
Sportspeople from Manhattan
Boxers from New York City
Welterweight boxers
American male ultramarathon runners
American male boxers
Track and field athletes from New York City